Matthew Lee Allin (born 23 September 1978) is an English List A cricketer. He was a right-handed batsman and wicket-keeper who played for Devon. He was born in Bideford.

Allin made two appearances in the Cheltenham & Gloucester Trophy competition of 2003, the first game in September 2002 and the second in May 2003. He scored 23 runs in the two innings in which he batted, as well as three catches and one stumping.

References

External links
 Matthew Allin at CricketArchive 

1978 births
Devon cricketers
English cricketers
Living people
Sportspeople from Bideford
Wicket-keepers